Thomas Doughty may refer to:
Thomas Doughty (explorer) (1545–1578), English explorer
Thomas Doughty (artist) (1793–1856), American artist
Thomas Doughty (priest) (1636–1701), Canon of Windsor